Dominic Cianciarulo (born March 3, 1986 in DeLand, Florida) is a retired American soccer midfielder.

Cianciarulo attended DeLand High School where he was an All State soccer player.  He then attended Furman University, playing on the men’s soccer team from 2004 to 2007.  In 2005, he played the collegiate off season with the Central Florida Kraze in the fourth division Premier Development League and in 2007 with the Carolina Dynamo.  On April 10, 2008, he signed with the Charleston Battery of the USL First Division.

Honors

Central Florida Kraze
USL Premier Development League Champions (1): 2004

References

External links
Furman University
Charleston Battery

1986 births
Living people
American soccer players
Orlando City U-23 players
North Carolina Fusion U23 players
Furman Paladins men's soccer players
USL First Division players
USL League Two players
Charleston Battery players
Association football midfielders